Colegio San Agustin – Bacolod, also referred to by its acronym CSA-B, is a private, Catholic coeducational basic and higher education institution run by the Augustinian Province of Santo Niño de Cebu, Philippines of the Order of Saint Augustine in  Bacolod City Negros Occidental, Philippines. It was founded by the Augustinians in 1962.

Colegio San Agustin – Bacolod is a Philippine Accrediting Association of Schools, Colleges and Universities (PAASCU)-accredited institution, bearing a Level II accredited status in the majority of its academic programs.

History
The Augustinians acquired the Casanova School founded by Doña Soledad Locsin on August 9, 1961. On July 8, 1962, the Casanova School ceased to be and officially became Colegio de San Agustin de Bacolod; the school offered kindergarten, elementary and high school education.

Construction of the first building commenced in May 1963; it was inaugurated later that same year. On July 19, 1964, the College Department opened with curricular offerings ranging from Liberal Arts, Education, Commerce and Secretarial. CSA-B is the first school in Bacolod to offer the technology courses Chemical and Mechanical Engineering, Chemistry and Medical Technology.

The school's student population doubled after the College Department opened in 1964, and the administrators had another four-storey building constructed in early 1969. Inaugurated during the Christmas season of that year, this building was then the site of the Grade School and High School Department, the Audio-Visual Center and some offices of the deans of the departments.

The school opened the College of Nursing in 1970, its most prominent alumna to date being singer Kuh Ledesma. Construction of the school gymnasium began in 1975 and was completed two years after; this edifice was destroyed by a fire in 2014. A new gymnasium is currently under construction. In 1987 a building intended for the Basic Education Department was completed. In the 1990s, the school's name was simplified to Colegio San Agustin – Bacolod. The structure housing the College of Engineering was completed in 1998. In 2003, the Sto. Niño Early Childhood Learning Center campus was inaugurated. This is now called the CSA-B Villa San Agustin Campus (VSAC).

Facilities
 The Sto. Niño building, constructed in 1987 to cater to an increasing number of students. It is named for the image of the Santo Niño de Cebu.
 The Engineering building, renovated in April 1992.
 The Adeodatus building, (known as the "Student Center") constructed in March 1996; named after the son of Augustine of Hippo.
 The Anselmo Polanco hall, constructed in September 1996; houses the Learning Resource Center and is named after the Blessed Anselmo Polanco, an Augustinian priest martyred during the Spanish Civil War.
 The Sta. Rita de Casia hall, constructed in April 1997. It is named after the Augustinian saint Rita of Cascia.
 The San Nicolas de Tolentino hall, in the Engineering building; constructed in August 2000 and is named after the Augustinian saint Nicholas of Tolentino.
 The Student Center was renovated into a circular five-storey building during the 2002–2003 school year; the CSA-B Park was unveiled in June 2003.
 The Early Childhood Learning Center (now the Villa San Agustin Campus or VSAC), an extension campus of the school in Brgy. Villamonte, opened in June 2003.

Notable alumni
 Kuh Ledesma – pop and jazz singer
 Boyet Fernandez – coach of the Philippine Basketball Association's Sta. Lucia Realtors
 Noli Locsin – Philippine Basketball Association Mythical Team awardee
 Erik Matti – film director

Ten Outstanding Students of the Philippines
 Ma. Teresa J. Galido – National Awardee, 2001
 John Iver Solidum III – National Awardee, 2002

See also
 Augustinian Province of the Most Holy Name of Jesus of the Philippines
 Augustinian Province of Sto. Niño de Cebu, Philippines
 Augustinian values
 List of tertiary schools in Bacolod City
 Santo Niño de Cebu
 La Consolacion College Bacolod
 Colegio San Agustin - Biñan
 Colegio San Agustin - Makati
 University of San Agustin — Iloilo City

Gallery

References

External links
 Official website
 Official website of the Order of St. Augustine
 Augnet: Reference website on St. Augustine and the Order of Saint Augustine
 

Augustinian schools
Educational institutions established in 1962
Catholic elementary schools in the Philippines
Catholic secondary schools in the Philippines
Schools in Bacolod
Catholic universities and colleges in the Philippines
Universities and colleges in Bacolod
1962 establishments in the Philippines